Montcalm was a  armoured cruiser built for the French Navy in the 1890s. The ship saw service during World War I in the Pacific. Following the war, Montcalm was used as an accommodation ship. In 1934, the vessel was renamed Trémintin and was sunk during World War II by British aircraft.

Design and description
Designed by the naval architect Emile Bertin, the Gueydon-class ships were intended to fill the commerce-raiding strategy of the Jeune École. Montcalm displaced . The ship had a crew of 566 officers and enlisted men.

The Gueydon class had three vertical triple-expansion steam engines, each driving a single propeller shaft.

The ships of the Gueydon class had a main armament that consisted of two 40-caliber  guns that were mounted in single gun turrets, one each fore and aft of the superstructure. Their secondary armament comprised eight 45-caliber quick-firing (QF)  guns in casemates. For anti-torpedo boat defense, they carried four 45-caliber QF  guns on the forecastle deck, as well as ten QF  and four QF  Hotchkiss guns. They were also armed with two submerged  torpedo tubes.

The Harvey armor belt of the Gueydon-class cruisers covered most of the ships' hull. The curved lower protective deck ranged in thickness from 51 to 56 millimetres. A watertight internal cofferdam, filled with cellulose, stretched between these two decks. The 100-millimetre guns were protected by gun shields and the sides of the conning tower were 160 millimetres thick.

Construction and career

Laid down by Forges et Chantiers de la Méditerranée at their La Seyne-sur-Mer shipyard on 27 September 1898, she was launched on 27 March 1900 and was commissioned on 24 March 1902, before completing her trials, to ferry the President of the Republic, Émile Loubet, to Russia. Later that year she was commissioned for service in China.
 
After the outbreak of World War I, Montcalm supported in the Australian capture of Rabaul in September 1914. She was decommissioned and hulked as an accommodation ship on 28 October 1926. The ship was renamed Trémintin on 26 September 1934. She was at Brest in 1940 and was there sunk by the Royal Air Force on 16 August 1944.

Notes

References

 

 

Gueydon-class cruisers
1900 ships
Ships built in France
World War I cruisers of France
Naval ships of France captured by Germany during World War II
Ships sunk by British aircraft
Maritime incidents in August 1944